The Fernwood School is an academy based in Wollaton, Nottingham, Nottinghamshire, England.

It was previously known as Fernwood Comprehensive School.

In 2018 it was granted funding to expand to take an additional 450 pupils.

References 

Academies in Nottingham
Secondary schools in Nottingham